Jog Falls is a waterfall on the Sharavati river located in the Western Ghats running between Uttara Kannada and Shimoga districts of Karnataka, India. It is the third highest plunge waterfall in India. It is a segmented waterfall which depends on rain and season to become a plunge waterfall. The falls are major attractions for tourists and is ranked 36th in the list of free-falling waterfalls, 490th in the world by list of waterfalls by total height, 128th in the list of single-drop waterfalls in the World by the waterfall database.

Description

Sharavathi, a river which rises at Ambutirtha, next to Nonabur, in the Thirthahalli taluk takes a northwesterly course by Fatte petta, receives the Haridravati on the right below Pattaguppe and the Yenne Hole on the left above Barangi.

Halfway down, it is encountered by the Roarer, which precipitates itself into a vast cup and then rushes violently downwards to meet the Raja. The Rocket shoots downwards in a series of jets. The Rani moves quietly over the mountainside in a sheet of foam. The Tourism Department has built steps from the viewpoint at the top, where the waterfall can be seen from across, to the bottom of the hill. There are approximately 1,400 steps made to reach the bottom of the hill.

Significances
Associated with the waterfall is the nearby Linganamakki Dam across the Sharavati River. The power station has been operational since 1948 and is of 120 MW capacity, one of the largest hydroelectric stations in India at that time and a small source of electric power for Karnataka now. The power station was previously named Krishna Rajendra hydro-electric project, after the King of Mysore at that time. The name was later changed to Mahatma Gandhi Hydro-electric Project. It was served by The Hirebhaskara dam until 1960. After 1960, due to the ideas of Mokshagundam Visvesvarayya, Linganmakki Dam has been used for power generation.

Power 
The hydro-electric project was conceived by the government of Mysore in mid-1943. A scheme to generate 64,000 horsepower  at a cost of 358 lakh was designed. The Power House on the right bank of the Gerusoppa dam consists of four Francis-type turbines coupled to the generating units of 60 MW each. The units are configured to operate at a design head of 47.5 mtrs. An outdoor switchyard is located between the toe of the dam and the power house. Power from the outdoor yard is evacuated through a 220 KV double circuit transmission line connected to the state grid at Talaguppa.

The capacity was increased subsequently and currently generates 240 MW of power.

Transport connectivity

Jog Falls is situated Near Siddapura And Sagara city.
 Nearest railway stations (distance to the location):
 Talaguppa
 Sagara
 on the Mangalore - Bombay Konkan Railway route
 Bhatkal also on the Mangalore - Bombay Konkan Railway route
 Nearest bus station:
 Siddapura
 Sagara
 Jog Falls
 Nearest centre for private road transport is Siddapura.
 Nearest airport (aerial distance to the location):
 Domestic
 Hubli Airport (HBX): 
 International
 Bengaluru International Airport (BLR): 
 Mangalore International Airport (India) (formerly Bajpe Airport) (IXE): 
 Goa Airport (GOI):

See also
List of waterfalls in India
Kodachadri
Gudavi Bird Sanctuary

References

External links

 Jog Falls on jogfalls.in. Jog Management Authority. Retrieved 16 November 2018.
 Jog Falls on Karnataka Government official Website

 
Kingdom of Mysore
Waterfalls of Karnataka
Plunge waterfalls
Segmented waterfalls
Geography of Shimoga district